Orr is a surname of Irish and Scottish origin. It is derived from the Gaelic Odhar meaning "dark, pale". In Scotland, Orr may be a sept of Clan Campbell.

Etymology
The primary origin is from the Gaelic odhar, meaning "dark", "dun". Padraig Mac Giolla Domhnaigh, suggested that the Irish surname originates from an Anglicisation of Gaelic Mac Iomhaire. Mac Giolla Domhnaigh stated that this was an old name from Renfrewshire, and a sept of the Campbells; he stated that the name was earlier spelt Mac Ure.

In Ireland the name is common particularly in Ulster, and mainly found in County Antrim, County Down, County Londonderry and County Tyrone. The first recorded evidence of the name in Ulster is of those who came from Scotland with Sir Hugh Montgomery in 1606 to settle in North Down on lands ceded by the O'Neill family. They were chiefly Presbyterian, with some Episcopalians, and a few Roman Catholics and Quakers. According to Bell, the earliest record of the name in Ireland is that of a family in County Tyrone in 1655. However, according to Orr, the earliest record of the name in Ireland is of Richard Orr of Clontarf in 1563.

In Scotland, the name is first known to have been recorded in Renfrewshire. Historian Edward MacLysaght suggests that the name in Scotland derives from the parish of Urr in Kirkcudbrightshire. Indeed, the River Urr flowed through the area. A tradition of some of the Orrs in Northern Ireland has it that they were descended from outlawed brothers whose original family name was McLean; they crossed this river and then made their way by boat to Donaghadee in County Down in the early 17th century. Having escaped persecution, they took river's name as their surname and settled in Newtownards.

People 
 Alan Stewart Orr (1911–1991), Scottish-born Lord Justice of Appeal 
 Alexander D. Orr (1761–1835), American farmer and politician
 Alexander Ector Orr (1831–1914), pioneer of the New York City subway system
 Alice Orr-Ewing (born 1989), British actress
 Alice Greenough Orr (1902–1995), American rodeo star
 Andy Orr (born 1980), member of the Irish band Six
 Sir Archibald Orr-Ewing, 1st Baronet (1847–1893), Scottish politician
 Benjamin Orr (1947–2000), bass guitarist and singer-songwriter of The Cars
 Benjamin Orr (Massachusetts politician) (1772–1828), American politician
 Bobby Orr (born 1948), Canadian Hall-of-Fame ice hockey player
 Bradley Orr (born 1982), English footballer
 Buxton Orr (1924–1997), British composer
 C. Rob Orr (born 1950), American swimmer and coach
 Charles Lindsay Orr-Ewing (1860–1903), Scottish politician
 Charles Wilfred Orr (1893–1976), English composer
 Christopher Orr (disambiguation), several people
 Colton Orr (born 1982), Canadian ice hockey player
 Danny Orr (born 1979), English rugby league footballer
 Dave Orr (1859–1915), American baseball player
 David Orr (born 1944), American politician
 David Malcolm Orr (born 1953), UK civil engineer
 David W. Orr, American professor of environmental studies and politics
 David Orr (journalist) (born 1974), American journalist and poetry reviewer
 David Orr (businessman) (1922–2008), Anglo-Irish businessman, philanthropist and World War II veteran
 Deborah Orr (1962–2019), British newspaper columnist
 Doug Orr (born 1937), Scottish footballer
 Douglas Orr (1892–1966), American architect
 Edith Orr (1870–1955), Scottish golfer
 Emma Restall Orr (born 1965), British neo-druid
 Eric Orr (1939–1998), American artist
 Frank Orr (cricketer) (1879–1967), English cricketer
 Gary Orr (born 1967), Scottish golfer
 Gregory Orr (filmmaker) (born 1954), American writer and director
 Gregory Orr (poet) (born 1947), American poet
 Gustavus Orr (1819–1887), early pioneer for public education in Georgia 
 Hugh Orr (inventor) (1715–1798), Scottish-born American gunsmith, inventor and politician
 H. Allen Orr, American professor
 James Lawrence Orr (1822–1873), American politician
 James Orr (disambiguation), several people
 Jimmy Orr (1935–2020), American football player
 John Orr (disambiguation), several people
 Johnny Orr (basketball, born 1927) (born 1927), American basketball coach
 Jonathan Orr (born 1983), American football player
 Kay A. Orr (born 1939), American politician
 Leon Orr (born 1992), American football player
 Leonard Orr (born c. 1938), American developer of "Rebirthing-breathwork"
 Louis Orr (1958-2022), American basketball coach and former player
 M. A. Orr (1867–1949), British astronomer and Dante scholar, aka "Mary Acworth Orr Evershed"
 Margaret Orr, American television meteorologist
Marian Orr (born 1970), American politician
 Marion Alice Orr (1918–1995), Canadian aviator
 Mary Orr (1910–2006), American author
 Matthew Orr (born 1962), British entrepreneur
 Matthew Young Orr (1883–1953), British botanist
 Nick Orr (born 1995), American football player
 Pete Orr (born 1979), Canadian baseball player
 Philip Orr (born 1950), Irish Rugby International prop-forward
 Robert Orr (disambiguation), several people
 Robin Orr (1909–2006), Scottish composer
 Rodney Orr (died 1994), American NASCAR driver
 Ron Orr (born 1954 or 1955), Canadian politician
 Scott Orr, American video game designer 
 Shantee Orr (born 1981), American football player
 Sheena Shirley Orr (born 1959), original name of Scottish singer Sheena Easton
 Stephens Orr, Scottish photographer
 Stewart Orr (1872–1944), Scottish artist 
 Sydney Sparkes Orr (1914–1966), British/Australian philosopher
 Vickie Orr (born 1967), American basketball player
 Virgil Orr (1923–2021), Louisiana educator and politician
 Warren H. Orr (1888–1962), American jurist and politician
 Wesley Fletcher Orr (1831–1898), Canadian businessman, journalist and politician
 William Orr (disambiguation), several people
 Wyc Orr (1946–2014), American politician and lawyer
 Zachary Orr (born 1992), former professional football player

Fictional characters
 Orr, bomber pilot in the novel Catch-22 by Joseph Heller
 George Orr, protagonist in the novel The Lathe of Heaven by Ursula K. Le Guin
John Orr, protagonist in the novel The Bridge by Iain Banks

See also
Judge Orr (disambiguation)
Justice Orr (disambiguation)
Senator Orr (disambiguation)
Orr (disambiguation), place names and other meanings
Orrville (disambiguation), other places named after people with this name
Orrery

Notes

Further reading
Ulster pedigrees: descendants, in many lines of James Orr and Janet McClement, who emigrated from Scotland to Northern Ireland ca. 1607 by Ray A. Jones
William Orr of Ireland, Pennsylvania, and Kentucky and his Descendants by Paul J. Ostendorf
The Book of Ulster Surnames by Robert Bell 
"Brief Sketch of the Genealogy of Captain Thomas Orr, Late of Franklin County, Pennsylvania, and his descendants" compiled by John G. Orr and Andrew M.F. Orr (1923)

Surnames
English-language surnames
Scottish surnames
Surnames of Ulster-Scottish origin
Surnames of British Isles origin